Werner Dreßel (born 30 August 1958 in Hambach) is a German football coach and a former player. As a player, he spent nine seasons in the Bundesliga with SV Werder Bremen, Hamburger SV, 1. FC Nürnberg and Borussia Dortmund.

Honours
Hamburger SV
 Bundesliga: 1981–82; runner-up: 1980–81
 DFB-Pokal finalist: 1981–82

References

External links
 

Living people
1958 births
Association football forwards
German footballers
German football managers
SV Werder Bremen players
Hamburger SV players
1. FC Nürnberg players
Borussia Dortmund players
Eintracht Braunschweig players
Viktoria Aschaffenburg players
Bundesliga players
2. Bundesliga players
3. Liga managers
20th-century German people